Mazières-sur-Béronne is a former commune in the Deux-Sèvres department in western France. On 1 January, 2019, it was merged into the commune Melle.

See also
Communes of the Deux-Sèvres department

References

Former communes of Deux-Sèvres
Populated places disestablished in 2019